The TSN Top 50 CFL Players was a list of the greatest fifty Canadian Football League players, as selected by a panel of sixty former CFL players, then-current and former coaches, executives, and media members in 2006. The panel was assembled by sports television network TSN in partnership with the CFL. The results were announced as part of the 2006 Grey Cup festivities in Winnipeg, Manitoba.

The Top 50
The panel voted on a list of 185 players, including 119 named to the Canadian Football Hall of Fame on the basis of performance since 1945, and 66 others identified during a three-month research process. Brothers Doug Flutie and Darren Flutie bookended the top 50, while Damon Allen (professional gridiron football's all-time leading passer at the time; his record was surpassed on October 10, 2011, by Anthony Calvillo, who did not make the list), Milt Stegall (the CFL's all-time leader in touchdown receptions), Terry Vaughn (the CFL's all-time leader in receptions at the time; his record was beaten by Ben Cahoon in October 2010), and Joe Montford (perennial all-star defensive end), were still active when named to the list.

The Honour Roll
The remaining players were named to an honour roll.

 Jack Abendschan, OL
 Junior Ah You, DL
 Kelvin Anderson, RB
 Ron Atchison, DL
 By Bailey, RB
 Greg Battle, LB
 Jerald Baylis, DL
 Al Benecick, OL
 Paul Bennett, DB
 Dieter Brock, QB
 Tom Brown, LB
 Willie Burden, RB
 Ben Cahoon, WR
 Anthony Calvillo, QB
 Bob Cameron, P
 Hugh Campbell, WR
 Jerry Campbell, LB
 Eric Carter, DB
 Tom Casey, RB
 Ken Charlton, RB
 Bryan Chiu, OL
 Ken Clark, P
 Bill Clarke, DL
 Lovell Coleman, RB
 Marvin Coleman, DB
 Rod Connop, OL
 Royal Copeland, RB
 Jim Corrigall, DL
 Larry Crawford, DB
 Dave Cutler, K
 Peter Dalla Riva, WR
 Dave Dickenson, QB
 Rocky DiPietro, WR
 George Dixon, RB
 Ron Estay, DL
 Terry Evanshen, WR
 Lloyd Fairbanks, OL
 Bernie Faloney, QB
 Dan Ferrone, OL
 Norm Fieldgate, LB
 Joe Fleming, DL
 Willie Fleming, RB
 Dick Fouts, DL
 Cam Fraser, P
 Gene Gaines, DB
 Jeff Garcia, QB
 Ed George, OL
 Cookie Gilchrist, RB
 Tony Golab, RB
 Tommy Grant, WR
 Herb Gray, DL
 Terry Greer, WR
 Tracy Ham, QB
 Herm Harrison, WR
 Tom Hinton, OL
 Condredge Holloway, QB
 Dick Huffman, DL
 Tommy Hugo, OL
 Hank Ilesic, P
 Glen Jackson, LB
 Jack Jacobs, QB
 Gerry James, RB
 Alondra Johnson, LB
 Will Johnson, DL
 Tyrone Jones, LB
 Bobby Jurasin, DL
 Joe Kapp, QB
 Jerry Keeling, DB
 Ellison Kelly, OL
 John LaGrone, DL
 Ken Lehmann, LB
 Billy Ray Locklin, DL
 Earl Lunsford, RB
 Don Luzzi, DL
 Dave Mann, P
 George McGowan, WR
 Mark McLoughlin, K
 Danny McManus, QB
 Ed McQuarters, DL
 Derrell Mitchell, WR
 Frank Morris, OL
 James Murphy, WR
 Don Narcisse, WR
 Roger Nelson, OL
 Ray Nettles, LB
 Pete Neumann, DL
 Ray Odums, DB
 Uzooma Okeke, OL
 Red O'Quinn, WR
 Paul Osbaldiston, K
 Mike O'Shea, LB
 Tony Pajaczkowski, OL
 Elfrid Payton, DL
 Ken Ploen, QB
 Joe Poplawski, WR
 Noel Prefontaine, P
 Dave Raimey, RB
 Willard Reaves, RB
 Dave Ridgway, K
 Frank Rigney, OL
 Charles Roberts, RB
 Larry Robinson, DB
 Jim Rountree, DB
 Paul Rowe, RB
 Martin Ruby, OL
 Tom Scott, WR
 Vince Scott, DL
 Dick Shatto, RB
 David Shaw, DB
 Wayne Shaw, LB
 Bob Simpson, WR
 Ron Stewart, RB
 Jim Stillwagon, DL
 Don Sutherin, DB
 Bill Symons, RB
 Dave Thelen, RB
 Dick Thornton, DB
 Buddy Tinsley, OL
 Herb Trawick, DL
 Whit Tucker, WR
 Ted Urness, OL
 Pierre Vercheval, OL
 Virgil Wagner, RB
 James West, LB
 Mike Widger, LB
 Tom Wilkinson, QB
 Al Wilson, OL
 Earl Winfield, WR
 Harvey Wylie, DB
 Dan Yochum, OL
 Jim Young, WR
 Ben Zambiasi, LB
 Bill Zock, OL
 Joe Zuger, P

Notes

References

External links

Canadian Football League lists
Canadian football media
Canadian Football
The Sports Network